One Step Away is a pop rock band from Andover, Massachusetts. Formed in 2007, the band consists of vocalist Adam Carrington, guitarist Terence Healy, bassist Mike Nuzzolo, and drummer Ben Trudeau.

Following the release of their successful first EP, One Decision, in 2008, One Step Away began working with Dan Malsch and Alec Henniger of Soundmine Recording Studios (Four Year Strong, Framing Hanley, Forever the Sickest Kids) to produce their first full-length studio album, For the Broken, released in the fall of 2010. The album became available on iTunes on August 17, 2010.

Gaining exposure

Since releasing One Decision and For the Broken, One Step Away has played venues across the country including Universal Studios Hollywood Citywalk Stage, Whisky a Go Go, Fox Theater, and MGM Grand. For the Broken is on rotation on over 120 radio stations nationwide and in April, 2011, saw its debut on Australian radio.

One Step Away has been a chosen "Featured Artist" in various publications such as Breakout Magazine, SIR Magazine, Scope Magazine, and The Buzzin Box.  In 2010, they also earned a coveted spot in Alternative Press magazine issue No. 269 (December 2010) as "Unsigned Band of the Month" and selected as a "Spotlight Artist" on CMJ.

In 2008, only one year after forming, One Step Away won the Boston Music Festival. In 2009, they were selected as the winner out of 2,800 rock bands at the Famecast Rock Stage. One Step Away is a two-time winner of the Berklee College of Music Scholarships from TCAN Battle of the Bands.

In January 2011, One Step Away were nominated for The 10th Annual Independent Music Awards under the Pop/Rock Album category for For The Broken.

As of late 2013, drummer Ben Trudeau has moved on to work with his new project, For The Year alongside Steve Van Geyte and Luke Nagel.  Adam Carrington and Terence Healy have started a new project called The Violet.

Appearances 

One Step Away has made appearances on television stations across New England such as WBZ, Fox TV38, WCTX, WNAC, WSBK, WPXT, My R.I. TV, and WWLP.
On September 4, 2011, One Step Away performed on the nationally televised MDA Telethon after winning the Clear Channel and iHeartRadio Get Discovered contest.

On August 26, 2012, One Step Away appeared on In the Pit Interviews with Underground Takeover.

Members
Adam Carrington - Lead Vocals (2008–present)
Terence Healy - Guitar (2007–present)
Mike Nuzzolo - Bass (2007–present)
Ben Trudeau - Drums (2010–present)

Discography

Albums
For the Broken (Fall, 2010)

EP
One Decision (2008)

References

American pop rock music groups
Musical groups from Boston
Alternative rock groups from Massachusetts
Musical groups established in 2007